Samburu may refer to the following entities in Kenya:
Samburu people
Samburu language
Samburu National Reserve
Samburu County
Samburu, Kwale County, a village

Language and nationality disambiguation pages